First Lady of Zambia is the title attributed to the wife of the president of Zambia. Zambia's current first lady is Mutinta Hichilema, who has held the office since 24 August 2021.

The first lady of Zambia plays the ceremonial role of the spouse of the head of state, but has often expanded their influence beyond that. For example, the wife of the country's founding president, Betty Kaunda, was viewed as the mother of the nation and known as "Mama Kaunda." Maureen Mwanawasa used her platform as First Lady to be a strong advocate for safer sex for women, often handing out condoms at public events.

List of first ladies

Acting First Lady

Other's

List of officeholder

List of Living First Lady of Zambia

Vera Tembo (1953-)
Christine Kaseba (1959-)
Esther Lungu (1961-)
Maureen Mwanawasa (1963-)
Charlotte Scott (1963-)

List of Spouse of president but not the first lady

See also
 President of Zambia

References

 
Zambia
Politics of Zambia